Castletown Geoghegan is a Gaelic Athletic Association club based in Castletown Geoghegan, County Westmeath, Ireland. The club first fielded a championship team in 1920 and is almost exclusively concerned with the game of hurling.

In senior hurling Castletown Geoghegan compete annually in the Westmeath Senior Hurling Championship, which they have won fourteen times as of 2022. The club also competes in various other championships in all grades within Westmeath.

History

Beginnings

The first record of hurling being played in Castletown Geoghegan dates back to 1911 when games were played in Loughlum. These were not on an organized basis but soon after a Kilkenny man named Mick Byrne who worked with CIÉ at Castletown Station brought his skill and knowledge of hurling to the area. In 1920 the first team was entered in the junior championship. Since Byrne was a Kilkenny man the chosen team colours were black and amber.  At this stage hurling had moved nearer to Castletown and the game was played in a field called the Planting.

Emigration was rife in the 1920s and as a result at the annual; general meeting of 1924 it was decided to disband the club. Joe Clarke, Pat Corcoran and Dan Leavy re-organized the club in 1930 and from that day to this the club has unbroken service in the county championships.

As of 2022, Alan Mangan was managing the club's hurlers.

Hurling Titles

 Westmeath Senior Hurling Championship (14): 1923, 1956, 1957, 1958, 1960, 1964, 1979, 1982, 1986, 1990, 2004, 2013, 2017, 2022
 Westmeath Under-21 Hurling Championship (13): 1970, 1971, 1973, 1974, 1975, 1980, 1991, 1996, 2005, 2006, 2013, 2014, 2015
 Westmeath Minor Hurling Championship (14): 1968, 2002, 2003, 2004, 2006, 2009, 2010, 2011, 2012, 2014, 2016, 2020, 2021, 2022
All Ireland u14 féile nGael (3): 2007, 2010, 2018

References

External links
Castletown Geoghegan GAA site

Gaelic games clubs in County Westmeath
Hurling clubs in County Westmeath